is a mountain in Kanazawa, Ishikawa Prefecture, Japan. It is visible to the east of Kanazawa Castle and has Toyokuni Shrine located on its slopes.

The summit of Mount Utatsu is used as a secondary triangulation point (named "Kanazawa") by the Geographical Survey Institute of Japan.

History
During the Bunsei era, Aoki Mokubei established the Kasuga kiln which revitalized the Kutani ware ceramics production of the area.

Because Mount Utatsu overlooks Kanazawa Castle, commoners were forbidden from climbing it during the Edo period. This led to the Ansei Tearful Insurrection in July 1858, a riot of over 2000 peasants during which the seven ringleaders were executed.

In 1947, a monument honoring author Shusei Tokuda was erected near the summit of Mount Utatsu. It featured writing authored by poet Murō Saisei and was designed by architect Yoshirō Taniguchi.

In 1958, a zoo and an aquarium were opened as part of recreational facilities attached to the Kanazawa Health Center, but they were closed in 1993.

The Prefectural Utatsuyama Sumo Ring was opened on the mountain in 1960 as a joint facility for high schools and Kanazawa University.

References

Utatsu, Mount